The hundred of Crediton was the name of one of thirty-two ancient administrative units of Devon, England.

The parishes in the hundred were: Colebrooke; Crediton; Kennerleigh; Morchard Bishop; Newton St Cyres and Sandford.

See also 
 List of hundreds of England and Wales - Devon

References 

Hundreds of Devon